Ernest Augustus (20 November 1629 – 23 January 1698), Duke of Brunswick-Lüneburg, was Prince of Calenberg from 1679 until his death, and father of George I of Great Britain. He was appointed as the ninth prince-elector of the Holy Roman Empire in 1692.

He was also ruler of the Prince-Bishopric of Osnabrück from 1662 until his death.

Early life and marriage 

Ernest Augustus was born on 20 November 1629 at Herzberg Castle near Göttingen, Principality of Calenberg, the youngest son of George, Duke of Brunswick-Calenberg and Prince of Calenberg, and Anne Eleonore of Hesse-Darmstadt.

On 30 September 1658, he married Sophia of the Palatinate in Heidelberg. She was the daughter of Frederick V, Elector Palatine and Elizabeth Stuart of England, and granddaughter of King James I of England. Sophia had been betrothed to Ernest Augustus's older brother, George William, who did not want her. When she married Ernest Augustus instead, releasing George William from this obligation, George William ceded to Ernest Augustus his claim to Lüneburg.

Prince-Bishop 
As the fourth son, Ernest Augustus had little chance of succeeding his father as ruler. Therefore, the couple had to live in the Leineschloss at the Hanover court of Ernest Augustus' eldest brother Christian Louis. However, in the Peace of Westphalia of 1648, it had been agreed between the Catholic and Protestant powers that the rulership of the Prince-Bishopric of Osnabrück should alternate between the two churches, and that the respective Protestant bishops should be members of the House of Welf. When the Osnabruck throne became vacant in 1662, the family appointed Ernest Augustus Prince-Bishop. Ernest Augustus and Sophia moved to Iburg Castle, together with their two living sons and Sophia's niece Princess Elizabeth Charlotte of the Palatinate (future sister-in-law of Louis XIV of France). In 1667 they began to build a more up-to-date residence, Osnabruck Palace, and in 1673 they moved there. Their youngest son was born there in 1674.

Christian Louis died childless in 1665, leaving Lüneburg to the second brother, George William, who had ceded his right to Ernest Augustus, who thus succeeded to that title. George William kept the district of Celle for himself.

In 1679, Ernest Augustus inherited the Principality of Calenberg from the third brother John Frederick. In 1680 the family moved back to Hanover.

Prince-elector 

In 1683, against the protestations of his five younger sons, Ernest Augustus instituted primogeniture, so that his territory would not be further subdivided after his death, and also as a pre-condition for obtaining the coveted electorship. He participated in the Great Turkish War on the side of Leopold I, Holy Roman Emperor. In 1692, he was appointed Prince-elector by the Emperor, thus raising the House of Hanover to electoral dignity, the elevation becoming effective in 1708 when confirmed by the Imperial Diet. He was nonetheless recognized as Elector of Hanover, the very first.

Death, succession, and legacy 
Ernest Augustus died in 1698 at Herrenhausen Palace, Hanover. He was succeeded as ruler by his eldest son, George Louis, later King George I of Great Britain.

His main residences were the Leineschloss, in Hanover, and the Herrenhausen, a summer residence a short distance outside the city. Ernest Augustus and Sophia had the Great Garden at Herrenhausen enlarged after Italian and Dutch models, creating one of the most distinguished baroque formal gardens of Europe.

Issue

Ancestry

References

1629 births
1698 deaths
People from Herzberg am Harz
Princes of Calenberg
House of Hanover
Lutheran Prince-Bishops of Osnabrück
Prince-electors of Hanover
Sophia of Hanover
Burials at Berggarten Mausoleum, Herrenhausen (Hanover)
Military personnel from Lower Saxony